Radhouane Chebbi (born August 8, 1986 in Tunis) is an amateur Tunisian Greco-Roman wrestler, who competes in the men's super heavyweight category. Chebbi represented Tunisia at the 2012 Summer Olympics in London, where he competed in the men's 120 kg class. He received a bye for the preliminary round of sixteen match, before losing out to Poland's Łukasz Banak, who was able to score three points in two straight periods, leaving Chebbi without a single point.

References

External links
Profile – International Wrestling Database
NBC Olympics Profile

1986 births
Living people
Tunisian male sport wrestlers
Olympic wrestlers of Tunisia
Wrestlers at the 2012 Summer Olympics
Wrestlers at the 2016 Summer Olympics
Sportspeople from Tunis
African Games bronze medalists for Tunisia
African Games medalists in wrestling
Mediterranean Games silver medalists for Tunisia
Mediterranean Games medalists in wrestling
Competitors at the 2015 African Games
Competitors at the 2013 Mediterranean Games
African Wrestling Championships medalists
20th-century Tunisian people
21st-century Tunisian people